The Palácio do Congresso Nacional is a building in Brasilia, Brazil that serves as the meeting place of the Brazilian national legislature, the National Congress of Brazil. It was built in 1960.

History
In early 1900s, the Brazilian National Congress happened to be in separate buildings in Rio de Janeiro which was then the national capital. The Senate was located near Railway Central Station, beside the Republica Square, at Moncorvo Filho Street, where there is today a Federal University of Rio de Janeiro students' center. The Federal Chamber of Deputies was located at Misericórdia Street, which would later be the location of the State of Rio de Janeiro's local Chamber of Deputies. From the 1930s to early 1960s, the Senate occupied the Monroe Palace, which was demolished in the 1970s to allow the construction of the subway Cinelândia Station. The Federal Chamber of Deputies moved to Brasília in the early 1960s, a process that took years to complete.

Since the 1960s, the National Congress has been located in Brasília. As with most of the city's government buildings, the National Congress building was designed by Oscar Niemeyer in the modern Brazilian style.

The semi-sphere on the left is the seat of the Senate, and the semi-sphere on the right is the seat of the Chamber of the Deputies. Between them are two vertical office towers. The Congress also occupies other surrounding office buildings, some of them interconnected by a tunnel.

The building is located in the middle of the Monumental Axis, the main street of Brasília. In front of it there is a large lawn where demonstrations take place. At the back of it, is the Praça dos Três Poderes ('Three Powers Plaza'), where lies the Palácio do Planalto and the Supreme Federal Court.

On 6 December 2007, the Institute of Historic and Artistic National Heritage decided to declare the building of the National Congress a historical heritage of the Brazilian people. The building has also been a UNESCO World Heritage Site, as part of Brasília's original urban buildings, since 1987.

2023 storming 

On 8 January 2023, the building was stormed by Jair Bolsonaro supporters.

References

Buildings and structures in Brasília